The Little Manatee River flows , from east of Fort Lonesome, Florida South of Hwy 674 and Earl Reynolds Rd In Hillsborough County through southern Hillsborough County, Florida including towns such as Sun City, Florida, and Gulf City, Florida and northern Manatee County, Florida into Tampa Bay. It flows along the Little Manatee River State Park for part of its route. Portions of the river Such as Hayes Bayou and Mills Bayou have been designated as an Outstanding Florida Water and are part of the Cockroach Bay Aquatic Preserve.

References 
 Florida Online Park Guide -Little Manatee River State Park
 Lamm, Greg. 1990. Little Manatee River. in Marth, Del and Marty Marth, eds. The Rivers of Florida. Sarasota, Florida: Pineapple Press, Inc. .
http://www.tampabay.wateratlas.usf.edu/River/?wbodyid=54&wbodyatlas=River

Rivers of Hillsborough County, Florida
Rivers of Manatee County, Florida
Rivers of Florida
Outstanding Florida Waters
Tributaries of Tampa Bay